Prenton is a Wirral Metropolitan Borough Council Ward in the Birkenhead Parliamentary constituency. Through the first decade of the twenty-first century, the ward was in Liberal Democrat hands, before shifting firmly to Labour in the second. But the 2019 council elections saw a swing to the Green Party that has been presented as characteristic of the Green gains in English council elections that year.

Councillors

Election results

Elections of the 2020s

May 2022

May 2021

Elections of the 2010s

May 2019

May 2018

May 2016

May 2015

May 2014

May 2012

May 2011

May 2010

Elections of the 2000s

May 2008

May 2007

May 2006

June 2004

May 2003

February 2003

May 2002

May 2000

Elections of the 1990s

May 1999

May 1998

May 1996

May 1995

May 1994

May 1992

May 1991

May 1990

Elections of the 1980s

May 1988

May 1987

May 1986

May 1984

May 1983

May 1982

May 1980

Elections of the 1970s

May 1978

May 1976

May 1975

May 1973

Notes

• italics denotes the sitting councillor • bold denotes the winning candidate

References

Wards of Merseyside
Birkenhead
Politics of the Metropolitan Borough of Wirral
Wards of the Metropolitan Borough of Wirral